Decimiana tessellata is a species of praying mantis in the family Acanthopidae.

See also
List of mantis genera and species

References

Hymenopodidae
Insects described in 1841